The Collectors is a British television drama about Her Majesty's Customs and Excise in the fictional Dorset town of Wrelling. Produced by the BBC, one series of 10 episodes was first shown in 1986.

Location scenes were filmed around the English resorts of Poole and Weymouth, in particular featuring the old Poole Customs House on the harbour.

Regular cast and characters
Peter McEnery as Harry Caines, the new district head of Customs
Michael Billington as Tom Gibbons, a Customs Officer
Pierre Vaneck as Charles Thieron, the main malefactor
Jack McKenzie
Lois Butlin
William Whymper
Robert Burbage
Jennifer Daniel

Availability
At present the series has not been released on DVD.

External links

Michael Billington in The Collectors

BBC television dramas
1980s British drama television series
1986 British television series debuts
1986 British television series endings